Nuno Silva may refer to:

 Nuno Silva (footballer, born 1975), Portuguese football player
 Nuno Silva (footballer, born 1986), Portuguese football player
 Nuno Silva (footballer, born 1997), Portuguese football player